Robert Lathan Calhoun (July 22, 1937 – August 6, 2020) was an attorney in Alexandria, Virginia, and served as a Republican member of the Alexandria City Council and the Senate of Virginia.

Early life and education
Calhoun was born in Oak Park, Illinois on July 22, 1937. He graduated from Tufts University in 1959 and Yale Law School in 1963.

Political career
In 1975, Calhoun was elected to the Alexandria City Council on the Republican ticket, serving two three-year terms. In 1984 he ran again for a vacant seat on the city council and served until December 12, 1988, when he was elected in a special election to the Virginia Senate, representing the 30th Senate District, which included most of Alexandria and some precincts in Fairfax County. He served one partial and one full term in the Senate before being defeated by the mayor of Alexandria, Democrat Patsy Ticer, in 1995.

He was selected as director of the Metropolitan Washington Airport Authority, serving from 1997 to 2003. He practiced law in Alexandria, Virginia.

He died of prostate cancer on August 6, 2020, in Berryville, Virginia, at age 83.

References

1937 births
2020 deaths
Virginia city council members
Republican Party Virginia state senators
Tufts University alumni
Yale Law School alumni
Lawyers from Alexandria, Virginia
Politicians from Alexandria, Virginia
People from Oak Park, Illinois
Calhoun family
Deaths from cancer in Virginia